Adli Lachheb (born 22 June 1987) is a Tunisian former professional footballer who played as a centre-back.

Career
In 2015 Lachheb moved to Jahn Regensburg.

He retired in summer 2022 after four years with SV Straelen and became assistant coach to new manager Sunday Oliseh at the club.

References

External links
 
 

1987 births
Living people
People from Monastir Governorate
Tunisian footballers
Association football central defenders
Tunisia international footballers
Kickers Offenbach players
US Monastir (football) players
Hallescher FC players
FC Erzgebirge Aue players
MSV Duisburg players
KSV Hessen Kassel players
SSV Jahn Regensburg players
SV 19 Straelen players
2. Bundesliga players
3. Liga players
Regionalliga players